The Tupolev I-4 was a Soviet sesquiplane single-seat fighter. It was conceived in 1927 by Pavel Sukhoi as his first aircraft design for the Tupolev design bureau, and was the first Soviet all-metal fighter.

Design and development
After the first prototype (under the development name Andrei Nikolayevich Tupolev fighter 5 | ANT-5), the I-4 was redesigned with a new engine cowling to decrease drag, with added rocket launchers on the upper wing and a larger tailfin. The lower wing was predominantly an attachment for the wing struts; it was almost removed in the second series, the I-4Z (where the lower wings were greatly shortened), and totally removed from the I-4bis, thus transforming the aircraft from a sesquiplane into a parasol-wing monoplane.

Operational history
The I-4 was used as a parasite fighter in experiments with the Tupolev TB-1 bomber. 
The aircraft was in Soviet service from 1928–1933. A total of 369 were built.

Variants
 ANT-5 : Prototype.
 I-4 : Single-seat fighter aircraft.
 I-4Z : Single-seat fighter with span of lower wings greatly reduced.
 I-4bis : Monoplane version (lower wings totally removed).
 I-4P : Floatplane version.

Operators

Soviet Air Force

Specifications (I-4)

See also

References

Bibliography

External links

I-04
Biplanes
Sesquiplanes
1920s Soviet and Russian aircraft
Single-engined tractor aircraft
Aircraft first flown in 1927